Bournemouth, Christchurch and Poole (BCP) is a unitary authority area in the ceremonial county of Dorset, England. It was created on 1 April 2019 by the merger of the areas that were previously administered by the unitary authorities of Bournemouth and Poole, and the non-metropolitan district of Christchurch. The authority covers much of the area of the South Dorset conurbation.

Background

Bournemouth and Christchurch are historically part of the county of Hampshire, whilst Poole is historically a part of Dorset and was a county corporate. By the mid 20th century the towns had begun to coalesce as a conurbation, and in the 1974 Local Government Act the three areas were brought together under the ceremonial county of Dorset, whilst still forming separate districts. In 1997 Poole and Bournemouth became unitary authorities, whilst Christchurch remained within Dorset County Council.

The new authority was formed as a result of local government reorganisation in the ceremonial county of Dorset. Under the plans, dubbed "Future Dorset", all councils within the county were abolished and replaced with two new unitary authorities. One was formed from the existing unitary authorities of Bournemouth and Poole, which merged with the non-metropolitan district of Christchurch to create the unitary authority to be known as Bournemouth, Christchurch and Poole. The other was created from the merger of the existing non-metropolitan districts of Weymouth and Portland, West Dorset, North Dorset, Purbeck and East Dorset to form a new Dorset authority.

The plans were supported by every affected body except Christchurch Borough Council, which formally opposed the reorganisation and unsuccessfully challenged the proposals in the High Court. Several Conservative councillors in Christchurch were suspended from the party for their opposition to the plan, with several of them subsequently standing as independents in the 2019 election.

Bournemouth, Christchurch and Poole Council

Statutory instruments for the creation of the new authority were made on behalf of the Secretary of State for Housing, Communities and Local Government on 25 May 2018, and a shadow authority was formed the following day. The shadow authority was composed of the existing borough councillors from Bournemouth, Christchurch and Poole, as well as the county councillors representing Christchurch. The shadow authority had 125 members, and first met on 6 June 2018. However, a review by the Local Government Boundary Commission's reduced the number of wards for the new authority to 33 multi-member wards, with 76 councillors in total.

The first elections took place in 2019 alongside other local elections, and led to the Conservatives holding the most seats but lacking a majority, meaning that the council was under no overall control. Subsequent to the election, the Liberal Democrats, the second largest party in the council, led the creation of the Unity Alliance Administration, made up of the Liberal Democrats (15), Independents (11), Poole People (7), Labour (3), Green Party (2) and Alliance for Local Living (1). The Unity Alliance therefore had 39 members, the number required for a majority. The remaining councillors, belonging to the Conservative Party (36) and UKIP (1), remained in opposition. However, two Unity Alliance councillors died in 2020, and two Poole People councillors left both their party and the administration, leaving the administration in minority; a vote of no confidence in council leader Vikki Slade was subsequently passed, removing her as leader. A new leader was elected on 1 October 2020.

Geography 

The authority lies in the South East of the ceremonial county of Dorset around 150 km from London. Dorset as a whole is part of the South West region of England, which is used for statistical purposes. The three former boroughs are all historically seaside towns with tourism playing an important part in the local economy. Bournemouth and Poole lie north of Poole Harbour, whilst Christchurch contains Christchurch Harbour, with the Isle of Wight and Solent to the East and English Channel to the South and West.

Climate 
Bournemouth, Christchurch and Poole has an Oceanic Temperate Climate. The presence of the Gulf Stream ensures that the British Isles maintain an all-year-round ambient temperature, and, because of its position on the south coast of England, the area has slightly warmer winters and cooler summers than settlements further inland.

Demographics 

The major settlements within Bournemouth, Christchurch and Poole are Bournemouth, Poole, Christchurch and Merley / Oakley. Within the ceremonial county of Dorset, Bournemouth and Poole are the largest two settlements, whilst Christchurch is the fourth, after Weymouth.

Bournemouth, Christchurch and Poole roughly overlaps with the South-East Dorset Conurbation, although the latter also spreads to the former East Dorset Borough and parts of the New Forest district of Hampshire. As such, the area lies within the South West Hampshire/South East Dorset Green Belt, created between 1958 and 1980, which regulates environmental and planning policy to manage development expansion.

Landmarks

See also 
2019–2021 structural changes to local government in England
South East Dorset conurbation

References

External links

 
Local government in Bournemouth
Local government in Dorset
Unitary authority districts of England
Local government districts of South West England